Sheikh Hamad bin Abdullah bin Jassim bin Muhammed Al Thani (1896 – 27 May 1948) was Crown Prince of the State of Qatar. Sheikh Hamad was the second son of the second Emir of Qatar, Sheikh Abdullah bin Jassim Al Thani, and also the father of the fifth Emir of Qatar, Sheikh Khalifa bin Hamad Al Thani.

Life
He was born in Doha and educated privately at the palace. In 1935, he was appointed as Heir Apparent by his father and served as Deputy Ruler on several times. Early on in his childhood, his father exposed him in to the life of a politician. He died early; he was expected to become the next emir, but he died when his father was alive. Later upon his death, his father passed the powers to his older son, Ali bin Abdullah Al Thani.

He died at Dukhan on 27 May 1948.

Marriage and children
During his life Sheikh Hamad married his first cousin Sheikha Sarah bint Mohammed bin Jassim Al Thani. They had nine sons:

Sheikh Jassim bin Hamad Al Thani
Sheikh Abdelaziz bin Hamad Al Thani
Sheikh Mohammed bin Hamad Al Thani
Sheikh Khalifa bin Hamad Al Thani, 5th Emir of Qatar
Sheikh Abdelrahman bin Hamad Al Thani
Sheikh Suhaim bin Hamad Al Thani
Sheikh Khalid bin Hamad Al Thani
Sheikh Nassir bin Hamad Al Thani
Sheikh Ahmed bin Hamad Al Thani

References
AR: Althani family tree
AR: Shk Hamad page in Althani family tree

Notes

House of Thani
1948 deaths
1896 births
Emirs of Qatar
Heirs apparent who never acceded
Sons of monarchs